Alphinellus carinipennis is a species of longhorn beetles of the subfamily Lamiinae. It was described by Henry Walter Bates in 1885, and is known from Mexico.

References

Beetles described in 1885
Endemic insects of Mexico
Acanthocinini